This is a list of the 22 members of the European Parliament for Belgium in the 2009 to 2014 session.

Lists

Party representation

Notes

Belgium
2009
List